Daniel Sliper (born 23 April 1987) is a Swedish footballer who plays as a left or right midfielder.

References

External links
  (archive)
 
 
 

1987 births
Living people
Swedish footballers
Sweden youth international footballers
Association football midfielders
Malmö FF players
IF Limhamn Bunkeflo (men) players
GIF Sundsvall players
Örgryte IS players
Assyriska FF players
IK Frej players
Allsvenskan players
Superettan players